Limnae or Limnai was a town of ancient Bithynia on the coast of the Propontis.

It was a colony of Miletus.

Its site is located near Hersek, in Asiatic Turkey.

References

Populated places in Bithynia
Former populated places in Turkey
History of Yalova Province
Greek colonies in the Thracian Chersonese